The Ju-Jitsu International Federation (JJIF) is an international sport federation founded in 1998 after the expansion of the European Ju-Jitsu Federation (EJJF) for the propagation of the modern competitive sports version of Jujitsu, also known as Sport Ju-Jitsu.

As a member of the General Association of International Sport Federations (GAISF) and the International World Games Association (IWGA), the JJIF represents Sports Ju-Jitsu worldwide. The JJIF is currently the only Jujutsu/Ju-Jitsu organization recognized by the GAISF and IWGA; Ju-Jitsu under JJIF rules is a part of the World Games and World Combat Games.

History 
The Federation commenced as a coalition of three countries' associations. In 1977, delegates form Germany, Italy and Sweden founded the European Ju-Jitsu Federation (EJJF). As the number of member Nations increased, in and out of Europe, in 1987 the Federation changed its name to International Ju-Jitsu Federation (IJJF) and the original European nucleus of the Federation became the first Continental Union (EJJU) of the IJJF.  Following a series of changes of its Statutes and a change to its membership structure, in 1998, the IJJF decided to change its name to the Ju-Jitsu International Federation (JJIF).

In the early 1990s the IJJF became a provisional member of the General Association of International Sport Federations (GAISF), member of International World Games Association (IWGA – part of the Olympic Movement together with the IOC) and affiliated to the Sport for All Federation (FISpT). During the 1998 GAISF Congress the JJIF obtained full membership status.

Ju-Jitsu under JJIF rules has been an event at the World Games since the 1997 World Games in Lahti, Finland.

 1977: European Ju-Jitsu Federation (EJJF)
 1987: International Ju-Jitsu Federation (IJJF) / European Ju-Jitsu Union (EJJU) 
 1998: Ju-Jitsu International Federation (JJIF)

Regions
35+37+4+16+20=112 Nations in May 2022.

Euro
https://jjeu.eu/

https://web.archive.org/web/20191103220730/http://jjeu.eu/

https://web.archive.org/web/20191216023003/http://www.jjif.org/index.php?id=17

https://jjif.sport/europe/

35 Member nations in 2022.

Asia
https://web.archive.org/web/20191017021347/http://www.jjau.org/index.php?id=2

37 Member nations in 2022.

Oceania
https://jjif.sport/oceania/

4 Member nations in 2022.

Africa
https://jjif.sport/africa/

https://web.archive.org/web/20191222214149/http://www.jjafu.org/

Ju-Jitsu African Union JJAFU. @AfricanJuJitsu

16 Member nations in 2022.

America
https://web.archive.org/web/20191103011235/http://www.upjj.org/

https://jjif.sport/pan-america/

20 Member nations in 2022.

Events

World

seniors

Source:

https://jjif.sport/events/

https://web.archive.org/web/*/http://www.jjif.org/

https://web.archive.org/web/20191201072222/http://www.jjif.org/index.php?id=6

https://web.archive.org/web/20191129202656/http://jjif.org/index.php?id=12

https://web.archive.org/web/20200922021339/http://jjif.org/index.php?id=50

https://web.archive.org/web/20191130130459/http://jjif.org/index.php?id=27

https://web.archive.org/web/20191216023003/http://www.jjif.org/index.php?id=17

 1994 Ju-Jitsu World Championships
 1996 Ju-Jitsu World Championships
 1998 Ju-Jitsu World Championships
 2000 Ju-Jitsu World Championships
 2002 Ju-Jitsu World Championships
 2003 Ju-Jitsu World Championships
 2004 Ju-Jitsu World Championships
 2006 Ju-Jitsu World Championships
 2008 Ju-Jitsu World Championships
 2010 Ju-Jitsu World Championships
 2011 Ju-Jitsu World Championships
 2012 Ju-Jitsu World Championships
 2014 Ju-Jitsu World Championships
 2015 Ju-Jitsu World Championships
 2016 Ju-Jitsu World Championships
 2017 Ju-Jitsu World Championships
 2018 Ju-Jitsu World Championships
 2019 Ju-Jitsu World Championships
 2021 Ju-Jitsu World Championships
 2022 Ju-Jitsu World Championships

Juniors

Masters

Para

Euro
40th European Championship Adults Nahariya Israel 2022 2022.05.26 - 2022.05.28

European Championship masters Nahariya 2022 Israel 2022.05.29

https://www.sportdata.org/ju-jitsu/set-online/veranstaltung_info_main.php?active_menu=calendar&vernr=312#a_eventhead

Asia

2016
https://www.sportdata.org/ju-jitsu/set-online/veranstaltung_info_main.php?active_menu=calendar&vernr=17#a_eventhead - 2017
https://www.sportdata.org/ju-jitsu/set-online/veranstaltung_info_main.php?active_menu=calendar&vernr=49#a_eventhead - 2018
https://www.sportdata.org/ju-jitsu/set-online/veranstaltung_info_main.php?active_menu=calendar&vernr=127#a_eventhead - 2019
https://www.sportdata.org/ju-jitsu/set-online/veranstaltung_info_main.php?active_menu=calendar&vernr=267#a_eventhead - 2021
https://www.sportdata.org/ju-jitsu/set-online/veranstaltung_info_main.php?active_menu=calendar&vernr=318#a_eventhead - 2022

Africa

America

Traditional Jujutsu and Sport Ju-Jitsu 

Different schools (ryū) have been teaching traditional Jujutsu in Japan since the 15th century. The JJIF is not a governing body for any of these schools of traditional Japanese jujutsu—the JJIF does not exercise authority over traditional Japanese Jujutsu Koryu styles, which are often instead headed by leaders who claim leadership from unbroken lineages of transmissions from different Japanese ryū, some of them hundreds of years old.

Rather, the JJIF was founded as an international federation solely for governing Sport Ju-Jitsu, a competitive sport derived from traditional jujutsu.

Executive committee

Committee Fighting System

Rules of Sport Ju-Jitsu 

JJIF currently regulates three different types of competitions at the international level: the Duo system''', Fighting system and Ne Waza''.

Duo
The former is a discipline in which a pair of Jutsukas (Ju-Jitsu athlete) from the same team show possible self-defence techniques against a series of 12 attacks, randomly called by the mat referee from the 20 codified attacks to cover the following typologies: grip attack (or strangulation), embrace attack (or necklock), hit attack (punch or kick) and armed attack (stick or knife).

The Duo system has three competition categories: male, female or mixed, and the athletes are judged for their speed, accuracy, control and realism. It is arguably the most spectacular form of Ju-jitsu competition and it requires great technical preparation, synchronicity and elevated athletic qualities.

Fighting
With a different approach, the Fighting System is articulated in a one-on-one competition between athletes. The system is divided in several categories according to weight and sex

(Male categories: -55 kg, −62 kg, −69 kg, −77 kg, −85 kg, −94 kg, +94 kg; Female categories −48 kg, −55 kg, −62 kg, −70 kg, +70 kg).

The actual competition is divided in three phases (Parts): Part I sees the jutsukas involved in distance combat (controlled attacks with arms and legs and atemis of various nature – punches, strikes and kicks). Once a grab has been made the Fight enters Part II and hits are no longer allowed.

The jutsukas try to bring one another down with various throwing techniques (and points are given according to how "clean" and effective the action was). Also – despite being uncommon – submission techniques as controlled strangulations and locks are allowed in part II.

Once down on the tatamis (mats) the match enters its Part III. Here points are given for immobilisation techniques, controlled strangulations or levers on body joints that bring the opponent to yield.

The winner is the Jutsuka who has accumulated most points during the fight. Automatic victory is assigned to the Jutsuka who gets an "Ippon" (clean action, full points) in all three Parts. This type of competition requires timing, agility, strength and endurance.

Ne-Waza
Ne-Waza (ground technique) is one of the main Jujitsu (and Judo) bases. The fight of two opponents starts standing. Punches and kicks are not allowed. After starting the fight the referee interrupts only in critical moments, so normally the main part of the fight takes place on the ground. It is the goal to win by submission with a lock on the joints or strangulation. During the time of 6 minutes it is possible to gain points for throws, take-downs, controlling positions and actions to gain an advantage in the fight. The Ne-Waza Ju-Jitsu is extremely tactical and sometimes described as the chess game of martial arts. This ruleset is similar to Brazilian jiu-jitsu rules.

The contest duration is 4 minutes for cadets, 6 minutes for juniors and seniors (<=35 years) and 5 minutes for competitors from 36 years onwards.

Sport Ju-Jitsu and the Olympic Movement 

The JJIF is a member of GAISF and IWGA, and both organizations are in close cooperation with the International Olympic Committee (IOC). The organisation is striving to establish Sports Ju-Jitsu as an Olympic event in the future.

See also
 Pan Jiu-Jitsu Championship

References

External links
 United Society of JuJitsu Organizations - official website
 JJIF official website
 JJIF Referees official website

Jujutsu organizations
International sports organizations